The Corpicenses were an ancient people of Sardinia, noted by Ptolemy (III, 3).  They dwelt south of the Rucensi and north of the Scapitani and the Siculensi.

References
Ptolemy's Geography online

Ancient peoples of Sardinia